The 1985 Southeastern Conference baseball tournament was held at Alex Box Stadium in Baton Rouge, LA from May 9 through 11.  won the tournament and earned the Southeastern Conference's automatic bid to the 1985 NCAA Tournament.

Regular season results

Tournament

All-Tournament Team

See also 
 College World Series
 NCAA Division I Baseball Championship
 Southeastern Conference baseball tournament

References 

Tournament
Southeastern Conference Baseball Tournament
Southeastern Conference baseball tournament
Southeastern Conference baseball tournament
Baseball competitions in Baton Rouge, Louisiana
College baseball tournaments in Louisiana